Sheela Najeeb (born 7 September 1974) is a Maldivian film actress. She has established a career in Maldivian Film Industry and is the recipient of several awards, one Gaumee Film Awards and two Maldivian Film Awards. She made her screen debut alongside Junaid in a music video "Nudhaashey Magey Loabivaa" and featured in several films afterwards.

In 2001, she gained wider recognition for the lead role in the romance Hiiy Edhenee; a remake of Dhadkan, followed by Abdul Fattah's Aan... Aharenves Loabivin (2002) and his horror film Eynaa (2004). She received a Gaumee Film Award for Best Supporting Actress for playing the iniquitous mother in Zuleykha (2005). She went on to establish herself as a leading actress of Maldivian cinema by starring in horror film Zalzalaa En'buri Aun (2010) resulting in a Gaumee Film Award for Best Actress nomination. During the year played supporting roles in year's two highest grossing films, Niuma (2010) and Heyonuvaane (2010) where her performance gained critical acclaim. Her role as a whistleblower in the former and a ferocious wife in the latter fetched her two Best Supporting Actress nominations.

Career

1998–2004: Debut and early releases
In 2000, Najeeb made her television debut by playing the role of Aminath, an obedient young woman who is forced by her step-mother to marry an old businessman in Abdul Faththaah's television drama series Dhoapatta. Starring alongside Mohamed Shavin, Niuma Mohamed and Jamsheedha Ahmed, the series centers on unrequited love and complications of a relationship within and beyond marriage. The same year she played Zeena, a college student opposite Yoosuf Shafeeu and Niuma Mohamed, in Hussain Adil's romance Hiyy Halaaku. The plot combines two love triangles set years apart. The first half covers friends on a college campus, while the second tells the story of a widower's young daughter who tries to reunite her dad with his old friend. The film was an unofficial remake of Karan Johar's romantic drama film Kuch Kuch Hota Hai (1998) starring Shah Rukh Khan, Kajol and Rani Mukerji in the lead role.

In 2001, Najeeb received much acclaim for her role in Aishath Ali Manik's Hiiy Edhenee (2001) which was an unofficial remake of Dharmesh Darshan's romantic film Dhadkan (2000) starring Akshay Kumar, Suniel Shetty and Shilpa Shetty in the lead role. Cast opposite Ali Seezan and Asad Shareef, Najeeb played the role of Sheleen Yoosuf, a young woman who hailed from an extremely rich and influential family being forced to marry a man she does not like. She next starred alongside Yoosuf Shafeeu, Jamsheedha Ahmed, Mohamed Shavin and Ibrahim Giyas in Amjad Ibrahim-directed Aaah (2001) which revolves around two siblings involved in family business and the downfall of the younger brother's love life when he discovers his fiance is already married to an abusive husband.

Apart from working in Amjad Ibrahim's romantic drama film Kahvalhah Dhaandhen (2002) opposite Yoosuf Shafeeu, Najeeb collaborated with Ibrahim for his romantic horror film Dhonkamana (2003) which depicts the romantic relationship between a young man (played by Yoosuf Shafeeu) and an old woman (played by Fauziyya Hassan). Featuring Hassan, Yoosuf Shafeeu, Niuma Mohamed, Sheereen Abdul Wahid, Amira Ismail and Aminath Rasheedha, the film received mainly negative reviews from critics though its inclusion of the theme portraying the relationship between a couple with a large age group was appraised. It was followed by Abdul Faththaah-directed Aan... Aharenves Loabivin (2002) starred alongside Ali Seezan, Niuma Mohamed, Aminath Rasheedha and Neena Saleem where she played the role of Sara, the only child of a family who had a bitter relationship with her lovers and an unfortunate incident leading her to suffer from amnesia. Upon release, the film opened to positive response from critics and was a commercially successful project. She rose to widespread prominence in the television industry and was applauded for her performance as the forbearing second wife, in the Abdul Faththaah-directed critically acclaimed television series, Thiyey Mihithuge Vindhakee (2003) which was considered as one of the best series production in television industry.

Abdul Fattah's horror film Eynaa (2004) was released in 2004, in which appeared Najeeb, Mohamed Manik, Ahmed Shah, Khadheeja Ibrahim Didi, Ibrahim Jihad and Nashidha Mohamed as six colleagues who go on a picnic to a haunted uninhabited island and their battle for survival. The film garnered critical appreciation especially for its technical department and was a commercial success.

2005–11: Critical acclaim with supporting roles
Najeeb collaborated with Fathimath Nahula for the first time in her critically and commercially successful romantic drama television series, Kalaage Haqqugaa by replacing Jamsheedha Ahmed after the seventh episode, to portray the role of Nuzu, a depressive wife mourning over her dead husband. She repeated her collaboration with Fathimath Nahula for another critically appreciated and commercially prosperous project, a romantic drama film Zuleykha (2005) which narrates the journey of a nine years old girl seeking the lost love of her mother. Featuring an ensemble cast including Yoosuf Shafeeu, Mariyam Nisha, Ali Seezan, Mohamed Manik and Mariyam Enash Sinan, Najeeb played the role of an iniquitous mother which fetched her a Gaumee Film Award for Best Supporting Actress. Thirty three housefull shows of the film were screened at the cinema making it the highest grossing Maldivian release of the year. This was followed by Amjad Ibrahim's romantic drama film Hithuge Edhun (2006) which narrates the story of a disabled man. Najeeb played the role of Nisha, the devoted wife who has been abandoned by her husband, which resulted in another Gaumee Film Award nomination as the Best Supporting Actress. The same year, Najeeb collaborated with Arifa Ibrahim for her romantic television drama series, Vaguthu Faaithu Nuvanees (2006) which consists of fifty episodes. The series which follows the vengeance and retribution two best-friends go through when they both love the same person, features her in the role of Shazma, a religious and acquiescent woman who is mistreated by her brother and sister-in-law. The role was portrayed by Mariyam Zuhura before Najeeb replaced her from the thirty-fourth episode.

In 2008, Najeeb appeared in Fathimath Nahula's romantic drama film, Yoosuf which depicts the story of a deaf and mute man (played by Yoosuf Shafeeu) who has been mistreated by a wealthy family, mocking his disability. Featuring an ensemble cast including Yoosuf Shafeeu, Niuma Mohamed, Mohamed Manik, Ahmed Nimal, Fauziyya Hassan, Ravee Farooq, Zeenath Abbas and Ahmed Lais Asim, the film is considered to include most prominent faces in a Maldivian film. Najeeb played the devoted friend of the titular character and regarded her role to be one of the most challenging role she has portrayed in her career since most of her dialogues need to "audible and expressive in gestures". The film received widespread critical acclaim and was attained a blockbuster status at box office. A total of forty five housefull shows were screened at Olympus Cinema before the film was leaked online, however the producers were able to screen five more shows at the cinema making it one of the Maldivian all-time highest grossing movies. The film was Maldivian official entry at 2009 SAARC Film Festivals and holds the privilege of being the opening movie of the festival. Her performance earned her a Maldives Film Award for Best Supporting Actress.

Najeeb played the manipulative wife who tried to murder her own sister, in Ahmed Nimal-directed family drama film E Dharifulhu (2009) featuring an ensemble cast including Niuma Mohamed, Yoosuf Shafeeu, Mohamed Manik, and Ahmed Nimal. At 1st Maldives Film Awards, Najeeb received her first nomination as Best Actress for her performance in the film. Another release of the year, Loaiybahtakaa (2009), written and directed by Yoosuf Shafeeu stars her as a tailor who marries her best friend. The romantic drama, co-starring Yoosuf Shafeeu, Fathimath Fareela and Mohamed Faisal, tells the story of unrequited love, and proved to be a commercial success.

Najeeb's first release of 2010 was Ahmed Nimal's horror film Zalzalaa En'buri Aun starred oppsoted Yoosuf Shafeeu and Mohamed Manik. It was a spin-off to Aslam Rasheed's horror classic film Zalzalaa (2000) starring, Ibrahim Wisan, Ali Shameel and Niuma Mohamed. The film revolves around a mariage blanc, a murder of husband by his wife with secret lover and avenging of his death from everyone involved in the crime. She played the role of Shahana, an avaricious wife who kills her husband with the help of her secret lover. The film received mixed response from critics and it did average business at box office. At the 6th Gaumee Film Awards, Najeeb received Gaumee Film Award for Best Actress award nomination for her performance in the film. She next starred in Niuma Mohamed's directorial debut drama film Niuma (2010) alongside an ensemble cast including Mohamed, Yoosuf Shafeeu, Mohamed Manik, Aminath Rasheedha and Abdulla Muaz. She played the role of Aminath, the whistleblower who tried to help her husband's sister from being sexually abused by her father and brother. Upon release, the film met with widespread critical acclaim specifically complimenting the performance of actors and its dialogues. Ahmed Naif from Sun wrote; "Najeeb's fluctuation of expression and emotion with the change in each scene is remarkable". Being able to screen over thirty housefull shows of the film, it was declared a Mega-Hit at box office, and the highest grossing Maldivian release of the year. The film fetched her a Best Supporting Actress nomination at 6th Gaumee Film Awards ceremony, while winning the same category at 2nd Maldives Film Awards.

The last release of year featured Najeeb in Yoosuf Shafeeu's drama film Heyonuvaane (2010), opposite Shafeeu and Fathimath Fareela. The story revolves around a male who is victimised of domestic abuse. She played the role of ferocious wife who discriminate and abuses her husband for being underprivileged. The film received majorly negative reviews from critics though her performance was singularly commended. Ahmed Naif from Sun wrote: "The only good thing about this movie is [Najeeb]'s performance; which is clearly the best I have witnessed during the year from a heroine. She received another nomination as the Best Supporting Actress at 6th Gaumee Film Awards ceremony. Twenty two housefull shows of the film were screened at cinema, declaring it a Mega-Hit and second highest grossing Maldivian release of the year.

In 2011, two films of Najeeb were released, both of them failed to impress critics and audience though her performance was considered to be "the best from the cast" from each film. She first featured in Ali Shifau's psychological romantic thriller Zaharu alongside Ali Seezan and Niuma Mohamed. The film centers on a married man who has a weekend affair with a woman who refuses to allow it to end and becomes obsessed with him. She played the role of Shaheen, a devious woman who goes to any extent to trap her school-life crush. The film is inspired from Adrian Lyne-directed American psychological erotic thriller film Fatal Attraction (1987). Upon release the film received mixed response from critics and was declared a "flop" at box office. At the 7th Gaumee Film Awards, she received a nomination as Best Supporting Actress for the role. She also received a nomination in the same category for her performance in Zaharu at 2nd Maldives Film Awards. She then appeared in Yoosuf Shafeeu's family drama E Bappa (2011), featuring an ensemble cast including Hassan Manik, Yoosuf Shafeeu, Mohamed Manik, Amira Ismail, Lufshan Shakeeb, Mariyam Shakeela and Fathimath Fareela. A film about fatherhood and how he has been treated by his family, received negative reviews for its "typical stereotype style" and was a box office failure.

2012–present: Further releases

Najeeb's only release of 2012 was Abdul Fattah's romantic film Love Story (2012) alongside Ali Seezan, Amira Ismail and Aishath Rishmy. The film received negative response from critics. Displeased with the screenplay and performance of the actors, Ahmed Nadheem of Haveeru wrote: "None of the actors were given scope to build their characters and none was able to justify their character. With excessive emotional scenes, actors were exposed to over-acting and nothing more".

In 2015, Najeeb appeared in Ali Shifau-directed romantic film Emme Fahu Vindha Jehendhen alongside Mohamed Jumayyil and Mariyam Majudha. In a pre-premiere review from Vaguthu, Ismail Nail praised her acting skills along with those of Mohamed Manik. The film was the highest grossing Maldive film of the year, and was a commercial success. The following year, she played the role of Ruby, the frightened lady in a group of friends who gets trapped in a haunted house, in Fathimath Nahula's horror film 4426 (2016). Upon release, the film received mostly positive reviews from critics. Ahmed Nadheem of Avas labelled the film as a "masterpiece" and noted her performance to be "good". With twenty-five back-to-back housefull shows being screened, 4426 was declared as the highest grossing film of the year. Shafeeu-directed Baiveriyaa (2016), a comedy film featuring an ensemble cast was her second release of the year. The film revolves around an aspiring actress who flees from her family to pursue a career in the industry and the suspicions and confusions that arise. Upon release the film was positively received by critics. Nazim Hassan of Avas applauded the comical timing of the characters and picked the heated arguments between Shafeeu and Najeeb as the highlights of the film. He wrote: "Nobody could have played the role of Riyasha better than Najeeb. No one can match the evilness she has onscreen". The film emerged as one of the highest grossing films of the year.

2018 was a dull year for Maldivian film-industry with regards to 2018 Maldivian presidential election. Her only release of the year was the first Maldivian web-series, a romantic drama by Fathimath Nahula, Huvaa. The series consisting of sixty episodes and streamed through the digital platform Baiskoafu, centers around a happy and radiant family which breaks into despairing pieces after a tragic incident that led to an unaccountable loss. The series and her performance as a widow struggling to overcome with the memories of her deceased husband were positively received. The following year, she starred in Yoosuf Shafeeu's horror comedy film 40+ (2019), a sequel to 2017 released comedy film Naughty 40, which was well received both critically and commercially.

Media image
In 2011, Najeeb was selected in the top five as the "Most Entertaining Actress" in the SunFM Awards 2010, an award night ceremony initiated by Sun Media Group to honour the most recognized personalities in different fields, during the previous year. In 2012, she was ranked at the fifth position in the list of "Best Actresses in Maldives" compiled by Haveeru, where writer Ahmed Nadheem credited her "powerful performance" in Thiyey Mihithuge Vindhakee for the same. In 2018, she was ranked in the second place from Dho?'s list of Top Ten Actresses of Maldives where writer Aishath Maaha opined that Najeeb is the "perfect choice for any role from a vile to a soft-spoken woman".

Filmography

Feature film

Television

Short film

Accolades

References

External links
 

Living people
People from Malé
21st-century Maldivian actresses
Maldivian film actresses
1974 births